Long Branch may refer to:

Places

Bodies of water 
 Long Branch (Toms Dam Branch tributary), a stream in Sussex County, Delaware
 Long Branch (Chestatee River), a tributary to the Chestatee River in the US state of Georgia
 Long Branch, a tributary of Sligo Creek in Maryland
 Long Branch (Elkhorn Creek), a stream in Missouri
 Long Branch (Salt River), a stream in Missouri
 Long Branch (Troublesome Creek), a stream in Missouri
 Long Branch (Trent River tributary), a stream in Jones County, North Carolina
 Long Branch (Reedy Fork tributary), a stream in Guilford County, North Carolina
 Long Branch (Elkin Creek tributary), a stream in Wilkes County, North Carolina
 Long Branch (Lawsons Creek tributary), a stream in Halifax County, Virginia
 Long Branch (Little Nottoway River tributary), a stream in Nottoway County, Virginia
 Long Branch (Whitethorn Creek tributary), a stream in Pittsylvania County, Virginia

Communities 
 Long Branch, New Jersey, United States  
 Long Branch, Pennsylvania, United States
 Long Branch, Eastland County, Texas, United States
 Long Branch, Panola County, Texas, United States
 Long Branch, Toronto, Ontario, Canada
 Long Branch, Caroline County, Virginia, United States
 Long Branch, Fairfax County, Virginia, United States
 Long Branch, Fayette County, West Virginia, United States
 Long Branch, Wyoming County, West Virginia, United States

Parks 
 Long Branch Park in Onondaga County, New York, United States

Transportation
 507 Long Branch, a former streetcar route on the Toronto streetcar system
 , a Canadian Flower class corvette
 Long Branch GO Station, a GO Transit station
 Long Branch Loop, a streetcar loop on the Toronto streetcar system

Other uses
 Long Branch (Millwood, Virginia), United States, an historic house
 Long branch (phylogenetics), a concept in phylogenetics
 Long Branch Saloon, a famous saloon that existed during the Old West days of Dodge City, Kansas
 Long Branch Records, a sub label of the German record label SPV

See also
 Branch (disambiguation)
 Long Beach Branch